Club des patineurs lyonnais was an ice hockey team in Lyon, France.

History
The club was founded in 1953. They won the 1re série and were French champions in the 1955-56 season. Following their lone championship the club continued to frequently participate in the top-level French leagues. Their last appearance came during the 1982–83 Nationale A season. 

In 1997, Club des patineurs lyonnais went bankrupt, and the Lyon Hockey Club was founded as a successor club.

Achievements
 French champion (1): 1956.
 FFHG Division 2 champion (2): 1972, 1989.

References

External links 
 ACPL - CPL Veterans page 

Ice hockey teams in France